Thomas Christian "Tomcat" Johnson (February 18, 1928 – November 21, 2007) was a Canadian professional ice hockey player and executive. As a player, he played for the Montreal Canadiens and Boston Bruins in the National Hockey League. He later served as the assistant manager of the Bruins and the Bruins' coach. Johnson was the recipient of the Norris Trophy in 1959. He was inducted into the Hockey Hall of Fame in 1970.

Johnson died of heart failure at age 79 in Falmouth, Massachusetts. He was born in Baldur, Manitoba and was of Icelandic descent.

Hockey career

Johnson won the Stanley Cup as a player with Montreal in 1953, 1956, 1957, 1958, 1959 and 1960. After his playing career, Johnson was named on the Cup a seventh and an eighth time. His seventh time came as assistant general manager in 1970 and his eighth as the Bruins' coach in 1972. Johnson was a member of the Bruins organization for more than 30 years.

Awards and achievements 
 NHL Second All-Star team Defenseman (1956)
 NHL first All-Star team Defenseman (1959)
 James Norris Memorial Trophy winner (1959)
 Inducted into the Hockey Hall of Fame in 1970
 Inducted into the Manitoba Sports Hall of Fame and Museum in 1993
 Honored Member of the Manitoba Hockey Hall of Fame
 Regular season coaching wins percentage leader (0.738, minimum 100 games coached)
 Coach, 26th National Hockey League All-Star Game

Career statistics 

* Stanley Cup Champion.

Coaching statistics

References

External links 

Tom Johnson’s biography at Manitoba Sports Hall of Fame and Museum
Tom Johnson's biography at Manitoba Hockey Hall of Fame

1928 births
2007 deaths
Boston Bruins coaches
Boston Bruins players
Canadian ice hockey defencemen
Hockey Hall of Fame inductees
Ice hockey people from Manitoba
James Norris Memorial Trophy winners
Montreal Canadiens players
People from Interlake Region, Manitoba
Manitoba Sports Hall of Fame inductees
Stanley Cup champions
Stanley Cup championship-winning head coaches
Winnipeg Monarchs players
Canadian people of Icelandic descent
Buffalo Bisons (AHL) players
Canadian ice hockey coaches